Michael Fainstat (29 August 1923 – 29 December 2010) was a Canadian politician and a city councillor in Montreal, Quebec.

Background
In the early seventies Fainstat became a founding member of the progressive Montreal Citizens' Movement, also known as Rassemblement des citoyens et citoyennes de Montréal (RCM) in French.

City councillor
Fainstat was elected to Montreal's city council in 1974 against Civic incumbent James Bellin with 17 other RCM candidates, and represented the district of Notre-Dame-de-Grâce.

He was the only RCM candidate to win a seat in 1978. He was re-elected in the district of La-Confédération in 1982 and 1986.

Chairman of the executive committee
Fainstat served as Montreal's chairman of the executive committee from 1986 to 1990.

He was re-elected in the district of Notre-Dame-de-Grâce in 1990, but resigned in 1991. He was succeeded by Democratic Coalition candidate Claudette Demers-Godley on the city council.

Death
Fainstat died on December 29, 2010, due to Parkinson's disease. A commemoration of his life was held on January 9, 2011.

Footnotes

1923 births
2010 deaths
Deaths from Parkinson's disease
Montreal city councillors
Neurological disease deaths in Canada
People from Côte-des-Neiges–Notre-Dame-de-Grâce